Margaret Plant  is a Professor of Australian art history, and as of November 2022 Emeritus Professor of Visual Arts at Monash University.

Career 
Born in South Australia in 1940, Plant grew up in Williamstown and as a schoolgirl saw paintings by John Perceval of fishing boats the suburb's harbour,and later wrote the first monograph on the artist. 

Plant began tutoring in the University of Melbourne Department of Fine Arts in 1962 until 1965 and completed a Master of Arts in 1969 there with her thesis The realm of the curtain : Paul Klee and theatre.  Meanwhile, with Ursula Hoff she wrote The National Gallery of Victoria; Painting, Drawing, Sculpture published in 1968, and that year was appointed Lecturer at RMIT University. Hers was the first academic appointment of an art historian within an Australian art school; she was made Senior Lecturer there, a position she held until 1975. 

Plant returned to the University of Melbourne as senior lecturer in fine arts 1975–82 and resided in Malvern. She completed her doctoral dissertation Fresco painting in Avignon and northern Italy : a study of some fourteenth century cycles of saints' lives outside Tuscany in 1987.

From 1982–96, long association with Monash University as Professor of Visual Arts followed, and she has continued there as Emeritus Professor. Frequently a presenter at events and exhibitions at the National Gallery of Victoria, she has been outspoken about the invisibility or, or erasure of,women in Australian art and social histories and their representation in collections. From 1984-87 Plant was appointed to the Council of the Australian National Gallery, where on her retirement it was noted that her "contribution as one of Australia's leading academics in the field of visual arts, together with her particular knowledge of Australian art, was invaluable." In the 1990s she was an invited member of a committee, headed by the chief commissioner of Port Phillip Des Clark, established to build a museum of contemporary art in Melbourne, recently realised in design and construction of NGV Contemporary. 

Plant's research and writing is wide-ranging, in catalogue essays, academic papers, book reviews, journal articles and monographs, from Turner and Paul Klee to settlers' domestication of the Australian bush, 7128717926  and including a children's introduction to Australian art. Paul Giles in the Australian Book Review hailed Plant's 2017 book Love and Lament: An essay on the arts in Australia in the twentieth century, as "multivalent, wide-angled" and "ranging widely across architecture, film, photography, music, dance, and popular culture, as well as literature and painting [demonstrating] convincingly that, as she puts it, there was 'no dormant period' in Australian cultural and artistic life during this time."

Honours 
Plant was elected to the Australian Academy of the Humanities in 1985.

Monash University instituted the 'Margaret Plant Annual Lecture in Art History' in 2018, at which presenters have been James Meyer, curator, National Gallery of Art, Washington, in 2018; Christina Barton, director of the Adam Art Gallery Te Pātaka Toi, at the Victoria University of Wellington, in 2019; Ming Tiampo, Professor of Art History, Centre for Transnational Cultural Analysis at Carleton University, Ottawa, Canada, in 2021; and in 2022, Erika Wolf, research fellow at the Neboltai Collection of 20th Century Propaganda.

Publications

Books

Articles

References 

Australian art historians
1940 births
Women art historians
Australian art
Australian academics
Australian women writers
Fellows of the Australian Academy of the Humanities
Living people